Vice Admiral Ravindra Bhartruhari Pandit, PVSM, AVSM is a serving Flag Officer in the Indian Navy. He is currently the Commander-in-Chief of the Strategic Forces Command. He assumed the position from Air Marshal Rajesh Kumar. He earlier served as the Chief of Staff of the  Western Naval Command in Mumbai.

Career 
Pandit graduated from the National Defence Academy and was commissioned into the Executive Branch of the Navy in July 1984. He is an Anti-submarine warfare specialist.

During his career, he has attended the Defence Services Staff College, Wellington, College of Naval Warfare, Mumbai and the Royal College of Defence Studies, London. Pandit has commanded the Veer-class corvette INS Nirghat, the Nilgiri-class frigate INS Vindhyagiri and the only Amphibious transport dock  of the Indian Navy - the INS Jalashwa.
He has also commanded the 22nd Missile Vessel Squadron.

Flag rank
After promotion to the flag rank of Rear Admiral, Pandit commanded the Western Fleet.

Ashore, he has served as the Naval Advisor at the High Commission of India, Islamabad in Pakistan, the Assistant Chief of Naval Staff (Foreign Cooperation and Intelligence) at the Naval Headquarters and the Chief of Staff, Southern Naval Command.

In the rank of Vice Admiral, he has served as the Commandant of the Indian Naval Academy, Ezhimala before taking over as the Chief of Staff, Western Naval Command. On 26 January 2018, he was awarded the Ati Vishisht Seva Medal for distinguished service of a high order.

Awards and decorations
He was awarded PVSM on 26 January 2023.

References

|-

|-

Living people
Year of birth missing (living people)
Indian Navy admirals
Flag Officers Commanding Western Fleet
National Defence Academy (India) alumni
Commandants of the Indian Naval Academy
Graduates of the Royal College of Defence Studies
Recipients of the Ati Vishisht Seva Medal
Indian naval attachés
Defence Services Staff College alumni
Naval War College, Goa alumni